Allison Brennan (born September 29, 1969) is an American best-selling writer of romantic thriller novels. Her first book was published in 2005.

Biography
Brennan was born in San Carlos, California. In 1987, she graduated from Menlo School in Atherton, California, and attended college at UC Santa Cruz from 1987 to 1989, working as a legislative consultant in the California State Legislature from 1992 to 2005. In 1993, she married Dan Brennan, and they had five children. She currently resides in Elk Grove, California.

Since 2005, Brennan has published numerous novels, five of which are found in over 1000 libraries and have been translated into Japanese, Norwegian, German, Spanish, French and Italian. Most of her books have been New York Times best-sellers.

Bibliography

Novels

Predator trilogy
 The Prey (December 27, 2005)
Translated into German by Edith Waller as Leichte Beute, 2009 
Translated into Spanish by Alberto Magnet as La presa, 2006
 The Hunt (January 31, 2006)
Translated into German by Edith Walter as Lauf oder stirb, 2008
Translated into Spanish by Alberto Magnet as La caza, 2007
Translated into Japanese by Andō Yukiko yaku as Hanto, 2007
 The Kill (February 28, 2006)
Translated into German by Edith Walter as Sieh dich vor, 2009
Translated into Spanish by Martín Rodríguez-Courel Ginzo as  La trampa, 2007

No Evil trilogy
 Speak No Evil  (January 30, 2007)
Translated into German by Sabine Schilasky as Hass soll dich zerstören (2009)  
Translated into Japanese by Andō Yukiko as 唇...塞がれて. 下 / Kuchibiru fusagarete 
 See No Evil  (February 27, 2007)
Translated into German by Sabine Schilasky as  Rache wird dich treffen, 2010  
Translated into Japanese by Andō Yukiko as '瞳...閉ざされて. 下 / Hitomi tozasarete  Fear No Evil (March 27, 2007)
Translated into German by Sabine Schilasky as Furcht soll dich begleiten (2010)

Prison Break trilogy
 Killing Fear (January 29, 2008) In 1016 libraries according to WorldCat  
Translated into Italian by Matteo Diari as Omicidi a luci rosse, 2008 
 Tempting Evil (May 20, 2008)
 Playing Dead (September 30, 2008)

FBI trilogy
 Sudden Death (March 24, 2009)
 Fatal Secrets (May 19, 2009)
 Cutting Edge (July 28, 2009)

7 Deadly Sins
 Original Sin  (February 10, 2010)
Translated into German by Irene Eisenhut as Sündenjagd Carnal Sin (June 2010)

Lucy Kincaid
 Love Me to Death (December 28, 2010)
 Kiss Me, Kill Me (February 22, 2011)
 If I Should Die (November 22, 2011, includes novella "Love is Murder") New York Times Bestseller
 Silenced (April 24, 2012)
 Stalked (October 30, 2012)
 Stolen (June 4, 2013)
 Cold Snap (October 29, 2013, includes novella "Reckless" in the Mass Market Paperback)
 Dead Heat (June 3, 2014)
 Best Laid Plans (August 4, 2015)
 No Good Deed (November 3, 2015)
 The Lost Girls (November 1, 2016)Make Them Pay (March 7, 2017)Breaking Point (January 30, 2018)Too Far Gone (October 30, 2018)Nothing to Hide (April 30, 2019)Cut and Run (March 31, 2019)No Way Out (June 02, 2020)

Max Revere novels
 Notorious (March 2014)
 Compulsion (April 2015)
 Poisonous (April 2016)
 Shattered (August 2017)
 Abandoned (August 2018)

Short stories and novellas
 "Killing Justice" (in Killer Year, January 2008)
 "Deliver Us From Evil" (in What You Can't See, January 2008)  
 "A Capitol Obsession" (in Two of the Deadliest, July 2009)
 "Her Lucky Day" (in Blood Lite II, October 2010)
 "Ghostly Justice" (in Entangled, October 2011)
 "Above Reproach" (in Guns N' Roses, February 2012)
 "Vacation Interrupted" (in Love Is Murder,'' June 2012)
 "Murder in the River City" (digital novella, August 2012)
 "Reckless " (Lucy Kincaid digital novella, March 2013, would appear later in the year for the first time in print for 2013's "Cold Snap")
"Maximum Exposure" (Max Revere novella, April 2014)
 "Aim to Kill " (novella in Sweet Dreams boxed set. May 2015)
"Two to Die For" (Max Revere digital novella, September 2017)
"Storm Warning" (Lucy Kincaid digital novella, April 2019)
"A Deeper Fear" (Lucy Kincaid digital novella, January 2021)

References

External links
 

1969 births
21st-century American novelists
21st-century American short story writers
21st-century American women writers
American thriller writers
Living people
People from Elk Grove, California
People from San Carlos, California
American women novelists
Women thriller writers
Novelists from California